Ron Haviv (born 1965) is an American photojournalist who covers conflicts. He is the author of several photographic publications, is a co-founder of VII Photo Agency, lectures at universities and conducts workshops.

Biography
Ron Haviv was a student and graduate of Northern Valley Demarest High School in 1983, and later went on to graduate from New York University. Since the end of the Cold War he has covered conflict and other humanitarian crises worldwide. Haviv is known for his broad documentation of the Yugoslav Wars: the battle of Vukovar in Croatia, the Siege of Sarajevo, the atrocities committed at Serb concentration camps in Bosnia and Herzegovina, and the practice of ethnic cleansing as exhibited by Arkan's Tigers.

Haviv has also photographed the city of Juárez, a battleground of the Mexican Drug War where civilian, law enforcement and cartel member casualties occur daily. Additionally, Haviv covered the destruction of the 2010 Haiti earthquake, as well as the subsequent cholera epidemic, and celebrity support and involvement in its reconstruction. Haviv's photography also sheds light on malnutrition in Bangladesh, clashes between Los Angeles gangs and police forces, the 2009 Afghan presidential elections, the Sri Lankan Civil War, and the struggle for children in Darfur.

Haviv's photography has been collected and published in the books: Blood and Honey: A Balkan War Journal, Afghanistan: On the Road to Kabul, and Haiti: 12 January 2010.
He is one of seven co-founders of VII Photo Agency, formed in 2001, along with Alexandra Boulat, Gary Knight, Antonin Kratochvil, Christopher Morris, James Nachtwey and John Stanmeyer.
Haviv has channeled his focus on raising awareness for human rights violations by helping to create multi-platform projects for NGOs, such as Doctors Without Borders' DR Congo missions: The Forgotten War and Starved for Attention, UNICEF's Child Alert for Darfur and Sri Lanka, and the International Committee of the Red Cross' World at War.

In 2012 it was revealed an image from his book Afghanistan: On the Road to Kabul, which was also published on The Digital Journalist website, had been licensed to the arms manufacturer Lockheed Martin to advertise its small diameter bombs. According to figures in The Guardian in 2010 Lockheed Martin were the biggest seller of arms in the world, with sales exceeding $35 billion. Haviv responded to the controversy with a statement in which he textually says: "I draw a strict line between my photojournalism and commercial campaigns and feature examples of both on my website, where they are clearly labeled for what they are." Haviv also claimed that his photo agency "VII is not associated in any way with the images in question".

Publications
 Blood and Honey: A Balkan War Journal. TV Books, 2001. .
 Afghanistan: On the Road to Kabul. New York: de.MO, 2002. .
 Haiti: 12 January 2010. New York: de.MO, 2010. . 16 posters folded and boxed.
 Lost Rolls. Blurb Publishing, 2015. .

Solo exhibitions

Images of War, Perpignan, France (1995); Fotofusion, Palm Beach, FL (1996); The Newseum, New York, NY (1997); International Festival of Photojournalism, Gijon, Spain (1999); The Council on Foreign Relations, New York, NY (1999); Bayeux, France (2001)
Afghanistan: The Road to Kabul, Grazia Neri, Milan, Italy (2002); 92nd Street Y, New York, NY (2002)
Blood and Honey: A Balkan War Journal, Saba Gallery, New York, NY (2000); National Gallery, Sarajevo, Bosnia and Herzegovina (2000); Skopje Cultural Museum, Skopje, Macedonia (2001); Freedom Forum, London, England (2001); Rex Cultural House, Belgrade, Serbia (2002); Queen's Museum, Belfast, Northern Ireland (2005); Southeast Museum of Photography, Daytona Beach, FL (2005); War Photo Museum, Dubrovnik, Croatia (2003-2013)
Children of Darfur, The United Nations, New York, NY (2005); University of California, Los Angeles, CA (2006); International Human Rights Film Festival, New Orleans, LA (2008); San Francisco Mission Cultural Center, San Francisco, CA (2008)
Haiti: January 12, 2010, VII Gallery, New York, NY (2010); Fovea Gallery, New York, NY (2010)

References

External links
 
VII Photo Agency

1965 births
Living people
American photojournalists
War correspondents of the Yugoslav Wars
VII Photo Agency photographers
New York University alumni